The 2021 Men's Indoor African Cup was held in Durban, South Africa. It was originally scheduled from 25 to 27 September 2020, but was postponed due to the COVID-19 pandemic. On 30 December 2020 it was announced the tournament was rescheduled to be held from 16 to 18 April 2021.

The competition featured three teams, with the winner securing a place in the 2022 Men's FIH Indoor Hockey World Cup. The hosts and defending champions South Africa won the title by defeating Namibia 4–1 in the final.

Results

Standings

Fixtures
All times are local (UTC+2).

Final

Statistics

Final standings

Awards
The following awards were given at the conclusion of the tournament.

Goalscorers

See also
2021 Women's Indoor Africa Cup

References

Africa Cup
indoor hockey
International field hockey competitions hosted by South Africa
Indoor African Cup
Sports competitions in Durban
Indoor African Cup
Men's Indoor Africa Cup